Lee Thean-jeen is a Singaporean director, screenwriter and television showrunner best known for the Singapore television drama series AlterAsians, The Singapore Short Story Project, The Pupil, Code Of Law, Zero Calling, Reunion and This Land Is Mine, which is currently airing on Mediacorp's Channel 5.

He has also written or co-written, and directed, the feature films, Homecoming (笑着回家), Love...And Other Bad Habits (玩味爱情), Everybody's Business (人人有粪), Bring Back the Dead (招魂) and The Big Day(简单的婚礼). He was also a writer, director and executive producer on the Southeast Asian adaptation of the Scandinavian noir series, The Bridge for Viu and HBO Asia. In 2019, he was responsible for Singapore's first multilingual drama, 128 Circle, which is currently in its second season.

Career
Born in Penang, Malaysia, Lee attended Penang Free School, then graduated with a summa cum laude in Broadcasting And Film from Boston University's College of Communication. He went to work for the then-Singapore Broadcasting Corporation, producing corporate videos, before leaving to become one of the founding members of Film Formations, a Singapore-based production company.

He is currently the Managing Director of Weiyu Films, a content-creation and production company founded by him.

His first drama series, AlterAsians (2000), an adaptation of short stories by Singaporean novelists into telemovies and shot on 16mm film, won several awards, including Best Single Drama or Telemovie at the Asian Television Awards 2000.

A follow-up series of short story adaptations, The Singapore Short Story Project, won the Asian Television Award in 2003 for Best Drama Series and again, in 2008, for Best Single Drama or Telemovie.

The Pupil, a legal drama which he co-created, executive-produced, wrote, and directed was well-received by local audiences and critics alike, winning two major awards at the 2010 Asian Television Awards: Best Actress In A Leading Role for Rebecca Lim and Best Actor In A Supporting Role for Lim Kay Tong.

Code Of Law, a drama series on the criminal justice system in Singapore, has entered its fifth season, and spawned a universe of spin-off shows: Derek, its sequel Derek II and Forensik. All these shows have crossover characters and continuing storylines that culminate in 2020's Code Of Law: Final.

Zero Calling, a vigilante thriller based on a script by Lee, has entered its second season, after picking up a Best Actor award for its leading actor, Pierre Png, and a Silver Remi for Best TV Miniseries at the WorldFest Houston International Film Festival.

Lee was the first director to occupy Discovery Networks Asia's Documentary Director's Chair, a crossover programme for film and television filmmakers who have built a reputation for innovative, high-quality filmmaking to produce documentary work for Discovery Channel’s global network.

His first feature film, Homecoming (笑着回家), starring Jack Neo, Ah Niu, Afdlin Shauki and Rebecca Lim was one of the top-grossing local films in Singapore and Malaysia in 2011.

More recently, he was co-executive producer and director on "The Bridge," an Asian adaptation of the award-winning Scandinavian noir of the same name.

He has appeared on The Straits Times Power List in Entertainment, a barometer of the top ten most influential people in the local media industry. and was most recently named in Variety as one of Singapore's 10 TV players to look out for.

Filmography

Feature Credits
The Big Day (简单的婚礼) (2018)
Bring Back the Dead (招魂) (2015)
Everybody's Business (人人有粪) (2013)
Love...and Other Bad Habits (玩味爱情) (2013)
Homecoming (笑着回家) (2010)

TV series
128 Circle Season 2 (2022) Executive Producer-Director-Writer
This Land Is Mine (2021) Executive Producer-Director-Writer
Reunion (2021) Executive Producer-Director-Writer
128 Circle: Shaking Legs (2020) Executive Producer-Director-Writer
Code Of Law: Final (2020) Executive Producer-Director-Writer
The Bridge 2 (2020) Co-executive Producer-Director
Forensik (2020) Executive Producer-Director-Writer
128 Circle (2019) Executive Producer-Director-Writer
The Bridge (2018) Executive Producer-Director-Writer
Snoops (2018) Executive Producer
Code Of Law (2012-2018) Executive Producer-Director-Writer
The Hush (2016) Executive Producer-Director-Writer
Zero Calling (2014-2015) Executive Producer-Director-Writer
The School Bell Rings (2013-2015) Executive Producer-Director-Writer
The Pupil (2010-2011) Executive Producer-Director-Writer
Calefare (2008) Executive Producer-Director-Writer
Sense Of Home (2008) Executive Producer-Director-Writer
After Hours (2007) Executive Producer-Director-Writer
Déjà vu (French TV Series) (2007) Director, 4 episodes
The Singapore Short Story Project (2003-2007) Executive Producer-Director-Writer
Chase (2003) Executive Producer-Director-Writer
Restless (2002) Executive Producer-Director-Writer
AlterAsians (2000-2001) Executive Producer-Director-Writer

Web drama
Derek II (2019) Executive Producer-Director-Writer
I See You 看见看不见的你 (2019) Executive Producer-Director-Writer
Derek (2019) Executive Producer-Director-Writer
Divided 分裂 (2018) Executive Producer-Director-Writer

Telemovies
Rise (2016) Director-Writer
Wa-cheew! Rise Of A Kung Fu Chef (2016) Executive Producer
Two Boys And A Mermaid (2015) Executive Producer
Gone Case (2014) Executive Producer-Screenwriter
The Million Dollar Job: Raffles' Gold (2013) Executive Producer-Director-Writer
The Million Dollar Job (2012) Executive Producer-Director-Writer
Love 50%(爱情折扣) (2010) Director
Stories Of Love: A New Best Friend (2006) Writer-Director
Spoilt (2005) Director-Screenwriter
Amnesia (2002) Director

Documentaries
The Tokyo Shock Boys' Guide To Japan (2005, National Geographic) Director-Writer
Gourmet China: A Living Legacy (2005, Discovery Asia) Director

Short films
Timepieces(2017) Director-Writer

Awards

128 Circle Season 2  
Winner, Best Original Song for an Asian TV Programme or Movie, 2022 ContentAsia Awards 
Nominee, Best Actress In A Supporting Role, 2022 Asian Television Awards

This Land Is Mine  
Winner, Best Drama Series/Telefilm Made For A Single Asian Market, 2022 ContentAsia Awards 
Winner, Best Supporting Actress, 2022 Asia Content Awards 
Nominee, Best Actor, 2022 Asia Content Awards
National Winner, Best Drama Series, 2022 Asian Academy Creative Awards 
National Winner, Best Actor In A Leading Role, 2022 Asian Academy Creative Awards 
National Winner, Best Actress In A Leading Role, 2022 Asian Academy Creative Awards 
National Winner, Best Direction (Fiction), 2022 Asian Academy Creative Awards 
Winner, Best Souund, 2022 Asian Academy Creative Awards 
Nominee, Best Drama Series, 2022 Asian Television Awards
Nominee, Best Actress In A Leading Role, 2022 Asian Television Awards
Nominee, Best Actor In A Supporting Role, 2022 Asian Television Awards
Nominee, Best Cinematography, 2022 Asian Television Awards
Nominee, Best Editing, 2022 Asian Television Awards
Best Drama Shortlist, 2022 Rose D'Or Awards 

The Bridge  
Nominee, Best Director Of A Scripted TV Programme, 2020 ContentAsia Awards  

Derek II 
Nominee, Best Short-Form Drama Series, 2020 ContentAsia Awards

Divided 分裂 
Country Winner, Singapore, Best Original Programme by a Streamer/OTT, 2018 Asian Academy Creative Awards

The Hush 
Nominee, Best Actor In A Leading Role (Tony Eusoff), Asian Television Awards 2017 
Nominee, Best Actor In A Leading Role (Remesh Panicker), Asian Television Awards 2017 
Nominee, Best Original Screenplay, Asian Television Awards 2017 
Nominee, Best Drama Series, Asian Television Awards 2016 
Nominee, Best Direction (Fiction), Asian Television Awards 2016
Nominee, Best Original Screenplay, Asian Television Awards 2016

Rise
Highly Commended, Best Actor In A Supporting Role (Pierre Png), Asian Television Awards 2016

Bring Back The Dead 
Best Theatrical Feature, Platinum Remi, WorldFest-Houston International Film Festival 2015

Zero Calling 
Best TV Miniseries, Silver Remi, WorldFest-Houston International Film Festival 2014
Best Actor in a Leading Role, Asian Television Awards 2014 (Pierre Png) (also nominated in 2015)
Highly Commended, Best Original Screenplay, Asian Television Awards 2014
Nominee, Best Direction, Asian Television Awards 2014
Second Prize, Television Drama Category, National Scriptwriting Competition

Code Of Law
Nominee, Best Digital Fiction and Non-fiction Programme or Series, Asian Television Awards 2015 
Nominee, Best Original Screenplay, Asian Television Awards 2013

The Pupil
Finalist Award, New York Festivals 2011
Best Direction Commendation, Asian Television Awards 2010
Best Actress in a Leading Role, Asian Television Awards 2010 (Rebecca Lim)
Best Actor in a Supporting Role, Asian Television Awards 2010 (Lim Kay Tong)

Homecoming (笑着回家) 
Best Actor, Golden Wau Awards 2013 (Jack Neo)

The Singapore Short Story Project
Best Single Drama or Telemovie, Asian Television Awards 2008 (The Other)
Best Drama Series, Asian Television Awards 2003
Best Cinematography, Asian Television Awards 2003
Best Editing Commendation, Asian Television Awards 2003

AlterAsians
Best Single Drama or Telemovie, Asian Television Awards 2000 (Iris’ Rice Bowl)
Finalist Award, New York Festivals 2000 (Or Else, The Lightning God)
Highly Commended, Best Single Drama or Telemovie, Asian Television Awards 2001 (The Man In The Cupboard)

References

External links
 
 Asian TV Awards 2016 Nominees
 
 

Malaysian screenwriters
Living people
Boston University College of Communication alumni
Malaysian people of Chinese descent
People from Penang
Year of birth missing (living people)